Kyndall K. K. Dykes (born 12 November 1987) is an American-born Palestinian  basketball player for Al Ittihad Alexandria of the Egyptian Basketball Super League (EBSL). He also plays for the Palestine national basketball team.

High school and college career 
Dykes played for Warren Easton Charter High School in New Orleans and was named to the 2005 All-New Orleans District Team and was named District MVP after averaging 18 points, 7 rebounds and 4 assists.

He then played two seasons for Navarro College of the National Junior College Athletic Association (NJCAA) and was named a first-team all-region pick.

In 2007, Dykes transferred to New Orleans where he played two seasons for the Privateers. In his second season, he was named to the third-team all-Sun Belt Conference after averaging 17.3 points per game, second most in the conference.

Professional career
Dykes joined the Polish side KK Włocławek in January 2021 for a monthly try-out. In five games of the 2020–21 PLK season, Dykes has averaged 13 points (54 percent from the game), plus 3.6 rebounds, 2 assists and one steal. In two matches of the FIBA Europe Cup he added 19.5 points and had 4.5 rebounds and 4 assists. Triggered by this strong performance, Włocławek agreed to a two-year contract until June 2023, with the option of a unilateral termination by the club after the 2021–22 PLK season. Dykes chose Włocławek over several other offers from competing teams.

On July 24, 2022, Dykes joined Al Ittihad Alexandria of the Egyptian Basketball Super League.

National team
Dykes has been a member of the Palestine national basketball team at the 2021 FIBA Asia Cup qualification.

Player profile
According to Włocławek's head coach Przemysław Frasunkiewicz, Dykes is able to guard the rival team's best players, while scoring lots of points on offense. Further, Frasunkiewicz states Dykes' value as a team player.

Kyndall's brother Kenneth played college basketball for Porterville College.

References

External links
FIBA profile 
Profile at Eurobasket.com
RealGM profile

1987 births
Living people
KK Włocławek players
New Orleans Privateers men's basketball players
Palestinian expatriate sportspeople in Bahrain
Palestinian expatriate sportspeople in Poland
Palestinian expatriates in the Dominican Republic
Palestinian expatriates in Ukraine
Palestinian men's basketball players
Shooting guards